Kevin Murphy (born 15 August 1963) is a Zimbabwean cricketer. He played one first-class match for Mashonaland in 1993/94.

See also
 List of Mashonaland first-class cricketers

References

External links
 

1963 births
Living people
Zimbabwean cricketers
Mashonaland cricketers
People from Kitwe